Bagrationovsky District is an administrative district (raion), one of the fifteen in Kaliningrad Oblast, Russia. As a municipal division, it is incorporated as Bagrationovsky Municipal District. It is located in the southwest of the oblast. Its administrative center is the town of Bagrationovsk. Population:  45,672 (2002 Census);  The population of Bagrationovsk accounts for 19.8% of the district's total population.

Geography
The district is one of the westernmost in Kaliningrad Oblast. It is situated south of Kaliningrad at the border with Poland and is sparsely populated.

The former Prussian Eastern Railway runs through the district along the Baltic coast, connecting the city of Kaliningrad with Gdańsk in Poland. Another line, the former East Prussian Southern Railway, connects Kaliningrad with Polish Bartoszyce via Bagrationovsk; however, passenger service was discontinued in 2011. Two major roads, the R516 (part of the former Berlinka autobahn) and the A195, also lead through Bagrationovsky District to the Polish border.

The most important river in the district is the Prokhladnaya, which mouths into Vistula Lagoon.

Partnerships
The district is in partnership with Verden District in Lower Saxony, Germany.

References

Notes

Sources

Districts of Kaliningrad Oblast